West Virginia Route 76 is an east–west state highway in northern West Virginia. The western terminus of the route is at U.S. Route 50 in the shadow of Bridgeport's Benedum Airport. The eastern terminus is at U.S. Route 119 and U.S. Route 250 three miles (5 km) north of Philippi.

Major intersections

References

076
Transportation in Barbour County, West Virginia
Transportation in Harrison County, West Virginia
Transportation in Taylor County, West Virginia